The United Basketball Alliance of India, Inc. (UBA India) is "a professional basketball league with teams based in key cities across India for fans of all ages".

UBA India was incorporated on 28 September 2015 as a Delaware Corporation. With file number 5835701.

UBA India signed various partnership deals with major broadcasters. Including Ten Sports, which is the largest sports networks in India. They agreed to broadcast UBA India live matches. Ten Sports is owned by the Sony Pictures Networks India. One of Hollywood's major multi-billion dollar film studios.

Rajesh Sethi, the Global CEO of Ten Sports stated to the press, “We are delighted to partner with UBA for India’s first Professional Basketball League. I am confident that UBA will change the face of Indian Professional Basketball forever.”

The 2015 inaugural season of UBA India witnessed celebrities such as Abhishek Bachchan and Evelyn Sharma putting in a couple of appearances. Also the Union Minister of State for Parliamentary Affairs, Mr Mukhtar Abbas Naqvi as well as Telangana State’s Sports Minister, Mr Tigula Padma Rao Goud. Who both accepted the proposal to attend a basketball game in the capacity of special guests.

UBA India is equipped with the world’s most popular surface (flooring) made by Horner Sports Flooring. The main benefits of such surface is its aesthetic, durability, and transportability. Horner surface is widely use by the other majors basketball leagues such as NBA.

See also 
 UBA Pro Basketball League

External links

References

UBA Pro Basketball League
2015 establishments in India